"Freshwater herring" is a term applied to a wide variety of freshwater fish which resemble herring:
Clupeoides papuensis, toothed river herring
Coregonus albula, vendace
Potamalosa richmondia, Australian freshwater herring
Salvelinus grayi, the Lough Melvin charr
Sardinella tawilis, the bombon sardine